Sudur Pashchimanchal Academy Cup (SPA Cup) was a national level inter college cricket tournament in Nepal. Also known as Hotel Devotee SPA Cup, the matches of the tournament is played under Twenty20 format. It was the biggest cash prize cricket tournament in Nepal. The first edition of the tournament was held in 2010.

The SPA Cup is an asset of Sudur Pashchimanchal Academy (SPA), an eminent educational institute in the Far- Western Region of Nepal. Sudur Pashchimanchal Academy is the parent organization under which there are two institutions: Sudur Pashchimanchal Campus and Sudur Pashchimanchal Higher Secondary School.

Tournaments

2015 tournament 

New Horizon College, Butwal won the 2015 SPA Cup by defeating Sunshine College by 7 runs in the final. Saurav Khanal was named the Player of the Series.

2013 tournament 
Pentagon International College, Kathmandu won the 2013 SPA Cup after defeating NASA International College by four wickets. Naresh Budhayer was named the Player of the series.

2011 tournament 
NASA International College, Kathmandu won the 2011 SPA Cup. Manjeet Shrestha was named the Player of the series.

2010 tournament 
Pentagon International College, Kathmandu won the 2010 SPA Cup. Subhendhu Pandey was named the Player of the series.

Teams 

 SPA (Hosts)
 Durga Laxmi Multiple Campus, Kailali
 Farwest University, Kanchanpur
 Golden Gate International College, Kathmandu
 Holyland Higher Secondary School, Nepalgunj
 Jagannath Higher Secondary School, Baitadi
 Kailali Multiple Campus, Kailali
 Mahendra Namuna HS School, Dadeldhura
 Merryland College, Biratnagar
 New Horizon College, Butwal
 Pentagon International College, Kathmandu
 Sunrise Higher Secondary School, Kanchanpur
 Sunshine College, Bhairahawa
 Tikapur Multiple Campus, Kailali
 Tripura Sundari Campus, Achham
 Xavier International College, Kathmandu

References

External links 
 
 SPA Cup Archives at CricNepal

Nepalese domestic cricket competitions
Twenty20 cricket leagues
2010 establishments in Nepal